The 2020 United States Women's Curling Championship was held from February 8 to 15, 2020 at the Eastern Washington University Recreation Center in Spokane, Washington. The event was held in conjunction with the 2020 United States Men's Curling Championship. In the final, Tabitha Peterson defeated Jamie Sinclair 7–5.

Since Team Peterson met certain prerequisites in terms of world ranking points (60 points year-to-date or ranked 70th or higher) they would have represented the United States at the 2020 World Women's Curling Championship, which was scheduled to be held in Prince George, British Columbia. The tournament was canceled due to COVID-19; as the 2021 United States Championship has been delayed to May 2021 due to COVID-19, the 2020 champions will represent the United States at the 2021 World Women's Curling Championship. Team Peterson will also appear in the 2021 Grand Slam of Curling Champions Cup in 2021.

Qualification
There were three ways for teams to qualify for the championship:

 Top four American teams in the World Curling Federation (WCF) World Team Ranking System on Dec 2, 2019
 Team Roth
 Team Sinclair
 Team Rhyme
 Team Potter
 Three teams from the 2020 United States Women's Challenge Round
 Team McMakin
 Team Traxler
 Team Podoll
 A team selected from the 2020 United States Junior Women's Championship
 Team Strouse

Challenge round
Eight teams competed at the 2020 United States Women's Challenge Round, held at the Heather Curling Club in Mapleton, Minnesota, from January 3 to 5. Through a triple knockout competition the top three teams secured a spot at the National Championship. Two-time Junior Champion Christine McMakin was the first to secure a spot, defeating fellow junior curler Ariel Traxler in the 'A' bracket final. Traxler dropped down to the 'B' bracket final and had another opportunity to play for a spot in the Nationals, this time earning her spot by defeating Ann Podoll 8–4. Podoll then dropped to the 'C' bracket final where she defeated Stephanie Senneker to secure the third and final Nationals berth.

Teams
Eight teams participated in the 2020 national championship. Team McMakin and Team Podoll changed names to Team Lank and Team Workin, respectively, due to line-up changes.

Round-robin standings
Final round-robin standings

Round-robin results
All draw times are listed in Pacific Standard Time (UTC−08:00).

Draw 1
Sunday, February 9, 8:00 am

Draw 2
Sunday, February 9, 4:00 pm

Draw 3
Monday, February 10, 2:00 pm

Draw 4
Tuesday, February 11, 9:00 am

Draw 5
Tuesday, February 11, 7:00 pm

Draw 6
Wednesday, February 12, 2:00 pm

Draw 7
Thursday, February 13, 9:00 am

Playoffs

1 vs. 2
Friday, February 14, 12:00 pm

Semifinal
Friday, February 14, 7:00 pm

Final
Saturday, February 15, 12:00 pm

References

United States National Curling Championships
Women's curling competitions in the United States
Curling in Washington (state)
Sports competitions in Spokane, Washington
United States Men's
Curling, United States Men's
Curling, United States Men's
Eastern Washington University